The Haima Fstar (Fushida; Chinese: 福仕达) is a series of 5 to 8-seater microvan produced by the Zhengzhou division of Haima Automobile.

Overview
The Haima Fstar microvan was built on a chassis composed of two longitudinal beams and seven transverse beams, with the engine bay featuring a 1.2-liter DOHC 16-valve gasoline engine producing 91 hp and 112 Nm of torque in 2019.

F-Star Hongda
The Haima F-star Hongda or Fushida Hongda (福仕达 鸿达) was launched in 2009 as Haima's first entry to the commercial microvan market. The Fushida Hongda was facelifted in 2012 as the Fushida II or Xinhongda (新鸿达, New Hongda), featuring a redesigned front grill and redesigned rear end.

F-Star Tengda
An undated model was launched and sold alongside in 2010 called the Fushida Tengda (福仕达 腾达), featuring a 4100mm vehicle length with a 5100 liter cargo capacity. The 2010 Haima Fushida Tengda is powered by either a 61hp 1.0 liter engine or a 83hp 1.3 liter engine, with both engines mated to a 5-speed manual transmission. Design of the Tengda variant is shared with the previous Hongda variant.

F-Star Rongda
A third variant called the Fushida Rongda (福仕达 荣达) was launched in 2012 and sold alongside the other existing models. The Rongda variant features a completely redesigned front end and the rear end design of the Fushida II (Xin Hongda) while featuring a redesigned tailgate. Dimension wise the Rongda is 98 mm longer and 100 mm wider than the Tengda. The Rongda variant is powered by the Haima M-series M-12R 1.2 liter engine producing 92hp and 117Nm. According to officials, the fuel economy of the Rongda is 7 liters per 100km.

References

Microvans
2010s cars
Cars of China